Playa Lagun is a beach on Curaçao, located near the village of Lagún. 

Play Lagun is located in a small bay. Surrounding the bay, an apartment complex has been built. The beach is used as a starting point for snorkeling. There is a snack bar and also a restaurant and dive school.

References
Curaçao Travel Guide — Beaches, New York Times

Beaches of Curaçao